Go-Go Crankin' (also titled as Go-Go Crankin': Paint the White House Black) is a compilation album originally released in 1985. The compilation consist of ten original songs by prominent Washington, D.C.-based go-go bands of that time period. The music is heavily influenced by the popularity of go-go in the mid-80s in Washington, D.C. and throughout the Northeast. The album has been considered to be influential to the growing popularity of hip hop and go-go music in the 1980s.

Track listing

See also
 Go Go Live at the Capital Centre, 1987 go-go concert
 The Go Go Posse, 1988 compilation album
The Beat: Go-Go's Fusion of Funk and Hip-Hop, 2001 compilation album
Meet Me at the Go-Go, 2003 compilation album

References

External links
 Go-Go Crankin' at Discogs.com

1985 compilation albums
4th & B'way Records albums
Go-go albums
Island Records albums